
The Pastoralists and Graziers Association of Western Australia (PGA), is a Perth-based lobby group acting in the interests of agricultural and associated industries, in particular promoting free enterprise in the industry.

History
The PGA was founded in 1907.

Description
The PGA supports a free market system and strongly opposes "statutory marketing" and related governmental regulation. It has sometimes clashed with the Western Australian Farmers Federation, over issues such as lamb and wheat marketing.

References

External links

1907 establishments in Australia
Rural organisations in Western Australia